Fattori is an Italian surname. Notable people with the surname include:

Alessandro Fattori (born 1973), Italian alpine skier
Bruno Fattori (1891–1985), Italian poet
Domenico Fattori, Sammarinese politician
Giovanni Fattori (1825–1908), Italian artist
Osvaldo Fattori (1922–2017), Italian footballer
AJ Fattori, Lacrosse Player

Italian-language surnames